Santa Pakenytė (born 11 December 1990) is a Lithuanian female judoka and sambo athlete.

In 2011 Pakenytė won bronze medal in World Sambo Championships. Pakenytė qualified for the 2016 Summer Olympics.

References

External links
 
 

1990 births
Living people
Lithuanian sambo practitioners
Lithuanian female judoka
Judoka at the 2016 Summer Olympics
Olympic judoka of Lithuania
Universiade medalists in judo
Universiade bronze medalists for Lithuania
European Games competitors for Lithuania
Judoka at the 2015 European Games
Judoka at the 2019 European Games
Medalists at the 2015 Summer Universiade
Medalists at the 2017 Summer Universiade